Aspergillus calidoustus is a species of fungus in the section Ustus, which grows at 37 °C (formerly called A. ustus, a species that fails to grow at 37 °C) and exhibits high minimal inhibitory concentrations to azoles.  It is considered an agent of opportunistic infection.

Laboratory identification 
Colonies can appear white and progress to brownish-yellow.   Curved conidiophores and Hülle cells can be identified.  The conidia are echinulated (spiny).

References 

calidoustus